Milestones Restaurants Inc. (doing business as Milestones Grill and Bar) is a restaurant chain owned by Foodtastic. There are currently over 40 locations across British Columbia, Newfoundland and Labrador, Alberta, New Brunswick, and Ontario.

History
The first Milestones location opened on Denman Street in Vancouver, British Columbia in 1989. In 2002, Cara (now known as Recipe Unlimited) purchased a majority stake in the restaurant from the previous parent company, BC-based Spectra Group, Inc. Prior to Cara's acquisition, nearly all Milestones restaurants were located in British Columbia, with four locations in Ontario and one in Washington state. Cara rapidly expanded Milestones operations into eastern Canadian cities, including Toronto, Ottawa, Niagara Falls, and London. At the end of 2011, Milestones expanded into Kingston, Barrie, Waterloo, and Cambridge. On July 14th, 2021, it was announced that Montreal based restaurant franchiser Foodtastic had acquired Milestones.

See also
List of Canadian restaurant chains
List of assets owned by Recipe Unlimited

References

External links
 

Recipe Unlimited
Restaurants in British Columbia
Restaurants established in 1989
Restaurant chains in Canada
Companies based in Vaughan
1989 establishments in British Columbia
2002 mergers and acquisitions